The Pedreira Paulo Leminski is a 25,000 capacity outdoor concert venue located in Curitiba, Brazil.  It was partly named after Paulo Leminski, a twentieth century Brazilian writer, and because it served as the Municipal Pedreira, or rock quarry. Located in the neighborhood of Abranches, the site is about 103,500 metres long, its stage is around 480m², and it is surrounded by a rock wall thirty meters high. It was first opened in 1990.

The Wire Opera House, which was opened in 1992 for the first Curitiba Theater Festival. Together, the two sites make up the Parque das Pedreiras.

In July 2008, the holding of large events was prohibited in the place by an injunction in a Public Civil Action filed by the Public Ministry of Paraná, based on a request from the residents of the region, who alleged disrespect for the schedule of shows and riots caused by visitors. After a legal dispute between the space's neighbors and the municipal government, which had taken place since 2008, an agreement was reached, which included a renovation with new adaptations and some restrictions for shows and, thus, the quarry was released in September 2013. With the improvements made, at a cost of R$ 17 million, the space was reopened in March 2014.

Events in Pedreira
During the city's three hundredth anniversary celebrations, the Pedreira hosted the tenor José Carreras, who was accompanied by the Brazilian Symphony Orchestra.

Concerts (partial list)

References

Music venues in Brazil
Buildings and structures in Curitiba
Tourist attractions in Curitiba